The men's team competition was an inaugural event at the World Artistic Gymnastics Championships. It was not held in 1992, 1993, 1996, 2002, 2005, 2009, 2013, 2017, and 2021. In 1994, a separate team championships were held, apart from the individual events championships. This was the only year such a separation was made.

Three medals are awarded: gold for first place, silver for second place, and bronze for third place. Tie breakers have not been used in every year. In the event of a tie between two gymnasts, both names are listed, and the following position (second for a tie for first, third for a tie for second) is left empty because a medal was not awarded for that position. If three gymnastics tied for a position, the following two positions are left empty.

Medalists

Bold numbers in brackets denotes record number of victories. Names with an asterisk (*) denote the team alternates who also received medals.

All-time medal count
Last updated after the 2022 World Championships.

Note
 Official FIG documents credit medals earned by athletes from Bohemia as medals for Czechoslovakia.

References

 FIG Results: 1903 World Artistic Gymnastics Championships
 FIG Results: 1905 World Artistic Gymnastics Championships
 FIG Results: 1907 World Artistic Gymnastics Championships
 FIG Results: 1909 World Artistic Gymnastics Championships
 FIG Results: 1911 World Artistic Gymnastics Championships
 FIG Results: 1913 World Artistic Gymnastics Championships
 FIG Results: 1922 World Artistic Gymnastics Championships
 FIG Results: 1926 World Artistic Gymnastics Championships
 FIG Results: 1930 World Artistic Gymnastics Championships
 FIG Results: 1934 World Artistic Gymnastics Championships
 FIG Results: 1938 World Artistic Gymnastics Championships
 FIG Results: 1950 World Artistic Gymnastics Championships
 FIG Results: 1954 World Artistic Gymnastics Championships
 FIG Results: 1958 World Artistic Gymnastics Championships
 FIG Results: 1962 World Artistic Gymnastics Championships
 FIG Results: 1966 World Artistic Gymnastics Championships
 FIG Results: 1970 World Artistic Gymnastics Championships
 FIG Results: 1974 World Artistic Gymnastics Championships
 FIG Results: 1978 World Artistic Gymnastics Championships
 FIG Results: 1979 World Artistic Gymnastics Championships
 FIG Results: 1981 World Artistic Gymnastics Championships
 FIG Results: 1983 World Artistic Gymnastics Championships
 FIG Results: 1985 World Artistic Gymnastics Championships
 FIG Results: 1987 World Artistic Gymnastics Championships
 FIG Results: 1989 World Artistic Gymnastics Championships
 FIG Results: 1991 World Artistic Gymnastics Championships
 FIG Results: 1992 World Artistic Gymnastics Championships
 FIG Results: 1993 World Artistic Gymnastics Championships
 FIG Results: 1994 World Artistic Gymnastics Championships (Individuals Competition)
 FIG Results: 1994 World Artistic Gymnastics Championships (Team Competition)
 FIG Results: 1995 World Artistic Gymnastics Championships
 FIG Results: 1996 World Artistic Gymnastics Championships
 FIG Results: 1997 World Artistic Gymnastics Championships
 FIG Results: 1999 World Artistic Gymnastics Championships
 FIG Results: 2001 World Artistic Gymnastics Championships
 FIG Results: 2002 World Artistic Gymnastics Championships
 FIG Results: 2003 World Artistic Gymnastics Championships
 FIG Results: 2005 World Artistic Gymnastics Championships
 FIG Results: 2006 Artistic Gymnastics World Championships
 FIG Results: 2007 Artistic Gymnastics World Championships

World Artistic Gymnastics Championships
All-around artistic gymnastics